In the Flow with Affion Crockett is a sketch comedy television series starring Affion Crockett and produced by Jamie Foxx, MADtv co-creators Fax Bahr and Adam Small, Arrested Development creator Mitch Hurwitz and Two and a Half Men's Eric and Kim Tannenbaum.

Taped in the middle of 2010, it was picked up as a mid-season replacement by Fox in September 2010, under the name "Untitled Jamie Foxx Project". A premiere was announced for June 9, 2011, and then moved to August. It debuted in an hour-long premiere on August 14, 2011, with four half-hour episodes to air on following weeks. The show was cancelled due to low ratings after airing six episodes.

Premise
Affion Crockett (known for his role on Wild 'n Out) got his own sketch comedy show on FOX. As he brings it to primetime as he uses his impressions, rapping, comedic skills to make this show "in the Flow"

Episodes

References

External links

2010s American sketch comedy television series
2011 American television series debuts
2011 American television series endings
English-language television shows
Fox Broadcasting Company original programming
Television series by 20th Century Fox Television